The women's 200 metres event at the 2001 European Athletics U23 Championships was held in Amsterdam, Netherlands, at Olympisch Stadion on 14 July.

Medalists

Results

Final
14 July
Wind: -0.3 m/s

Heats
14 July
Qualified: first 3 in each heat and 2 best to the Final

Heat 1
Wind: -0.6 m/s

Heat 2
Wind: -0.6 m/s

Participation
According to an unofficial count, 12 athletes from 9 countries participated in the event.

 (1)
 (1)
 (1)
 (1)
 (2)
 (1)
 (1)
 (1)
 (3)

References

200 metres
200 metres at the European Athletics U23 Championships